Kenzhesh Sarsekenova-Orynbayeva (born 17 October 1972) is a Kazakhstani speed skater. She competed at the 1994 Winter Olympics and the 1998 Winter Olympics.

References

External links
 

1972 births
Living people
Kazakhstani female speed skaters
Olympic speed skaters of Kazakhstan
Speed skaters at the 1994 Winter Olympics
Speed skaters at the 1998 Winter Olympics
Place of birth missing (living people)
Speed skaters at the 1999 Asian Winter Games